The UEFA Intertoto Cup was a European association football competition, held during the summer for the leading European clubs that have failed to qualify for either the UEFA Champions League or the UEFA Cup. It provided "an alternative qualifying route into the UEFA Cup".  The tournament did not come under official UEFA sanction until 1995, and was abolished in 2009.

The first tournament provided two winners, both of whom therefore qualified for the UEFA Cup in the 1995–96 season, with Frenchman Jacky Duguépéroux and Yugoslavian Slavoljub Muslin as the winning managers. From the following season to the 2005 contest, three teams were awarded Intertoto Cups, with French managers being the most successful. In 2006, the format was modified to allow eleven clubs to qualify for the second qualifying round of the UEFA Cup, the Intertoto Cup being awarded to the team that progressed the furthest in the competition. Englishman Glenn Roeder lifted the cup that season as he guided Newcastle United to the last 16 of the 2006–07 UEFA Cup. German Jupp Heynckes is the only man to have won the cup twice and did so in consecutive years (2003 and 2004) with German club Schalke 04.

By year

By nationality
This table lists the total number of titles won by managers of each nationality.

See also
List of UEFA club tournament winning managers

References
General

Specific

External links
UEFA official history

Managers
Uefa Intertoto Cup